Mary M. Leue is a community activist and founder of the Albany Free School. She currently resides in Massachusetts.

Works 
 Schools In Their Own Words (2005)

References

Further reading

External links 
 Autobiography
 Challenging the Giant: The Best of SKOLE, the Journal of Alternative Education, volumes 1, 2, 3, 4

Educators from New York (state)
American women educators
Living people
Year of birth missing (living people)
People from Albany, New York